Martin Brudnizki is a Swedish interior architect and product designer, based in both London and New York.

Career 
Born in Stockholm, Martin Brudnizki moved to London in 1990. to study Interior Architecture and Design at American University in London.
In 2000 he founded Martin Brudnizki Design Studio in London, before opening a New York studio in 2012. Specialising in restaurants, bars, hotels and private clubs, he has created many well-known interiors around the world. This includes working with Richard Caring on The Ivy, Scott's (restaurant), Sexy Fish, The Club at The Ivy, Le Caprice, J Sheekey, Annabel's, 34 and the Ivy Chelsea Garden. Working with Nick Jones and Soho House on Soho Beach House Miami, Little House, Dean Street Townhouse, Cecconi's West Hollywood and Cecconi's Miami. Working with Rosewood Hotels & Resorts on Scarfes Bar and Holborn Dining Room. Working with The Royal Academy of Arts on The Academicians' Room and Fortnum & Mason with 45 Jermyn St. Working with Thompson Hotels on the Thompson Miami Beach and The Beekman  in the former Temple Court Building and Annex in New York. Working with Rocco Forte Hotels on the Villa Kennedy Frankfurt  and the Assila Hotel in Jeddah. Brudnizki is currently working with Thomas Keller on a new restaurant at the Surf Club at the Four Seasons in Miami. Alongside working with a number of other entrepreneurs, including Jeff Stober, owner of the Drake Hotel on his restaurant Drake One Fifty in Toronto, Jason Pomeranc on Sessanta in New York, Mark Hix on Hix in Soho, Richard Corrigan on Corrigan's in Mayfair  and Daniel Boulud on Café Boulud in the Four Seasons Toronto.

Awards and recognition
Brudnizki has been described as ‘one of the best restaurant and hotel designers of his generation’ by Wallpaper (magazine) and is regularly listed within both the London Evening Standard 1000 Most Influential People in the UK  and House and Garden Top 100 Leading Interior Designers. He has recently been listed as one of Debretts 500 Most Influential People, Debretts People of Today  and Wallpaper (magazine) Power 200  as well as being voted one of the '50 Best Interior Designers in the UK' by Country and Townhouse. A variety of projects have won top industry awards including The Beekman winning a BDNY Gold Key award for Best Luxury Lobby in 2017, 45 Jermyn St. winning Best Interior at the GQ Food and Drink Awards 2017 and Aquavit being named Best Outpost in the Wallpaper* Design Awards 2017.

And Objects
In 2015 Martin launched And Objects, a dedicated design studio from where he will create his own range of products. Co-founded by Martin and long-term friend Nicholas Jeanes, And Objects collaborates with design partners on bespoke collections, such as recently with Drummonds, The Urban Electric Co., George Smith, Porta Romana and Christopher Farr Cloth. And Objects took part in the Wallpaper* Handmade event during Salone del Mobile in Milan during 2017, designing a candlestick inspired by natural rock formations found at Giant's Causeway in Ireland. This is alongside developing an in-house range of products exclusive to the studio under the ‘Other Objects’ banner, which includes those pieces MBDS has previously designed for its interior projects, including the new Annabel's private members' club at 46 Berkeley Square.

References

External links

Year of birth missing (living people)
Living people
Swedish interior designers
Swedish architects
Swedish expatriates in the United Kingdom